Daiwon Digital Broadcasting, Ltd., established in 2001, is a company launched by Toei Animation, Shogakukan, Bandai, TMS Entertainment, Sunrise, Daiwon Broadcasting Company, Gina World and Bandai Korea. The company was capitalized with 4.2 million dollar, of which 8.25% were provided by Toei and around 11% by Bandai and its subsidiaries. It will be carried by SkyLife.

References

Anime television
Satellite television